Tahira is an Arabic name for females. There are several Semitic variations that include connotations given in Africa, Asia, and Europe. It is traditionally a given name for Muslims. It is the female variant of male name Tahir.

Tahira may refer to:

Given name
 Tahira Ismael-Sansawi, Filipino politician
 Tahira Syed, Pakistani singer
 Tahira Tahirova, Azerbaijani politician

See also
 Tahir
 Táhirih

Arabic feminine given names
Bosnian feminine given names
Pakistani feminine given names